Musnad Abu Yala, or Musnad Abu Yala, is a Hadith book, and was written by Imam Abu Yala al-Mawsili (210 – 307 AH).

Commentaries
Among those  who have written commentaries on this hadith collection are: 
 Musnad Abi Yala (307H) (مسند أبي يعلى الموصلي), Commentary by Saeed bin Muhammad As-Sinari (10 Volumes): Published: Darul Hadith

See also
 List of Sunni books
 Kutub al-Sittah
 Sahih Muslim
 Jami al-Tirmidhi
 Sunan Abu Dawood
 Jami' at-Tirmidhi
 Either: Sunan ibn Majah, Muwatta Malik

References

9th-century Arabic books
10th-century Arabic books
Sunni literature
Hadith
Hadith collections
Sunni hadith collections